This is the order of battle of the Japanese and Russian fleets at the Battle of Tsushima on 2728 May 1905.

Japanese Combined Fleet
Source: "Combined Fleet Command for Battle of Tsushima" Japanese version Wikipedia

First Squadron
(Admiral Tōgō Heihachirō)
 First Division (Vice Admiral Misu Sōtarō)
 Mikasa (Fleet Flagship) (variant of Majestic-class battleship) Captain Ijichi Hikojirō
 Shikishima (Shikishima-class battleship) Captain Teragaki Izō
 Fuji (Fuji-class battleship) Captain Matsumoto Kazu
 Asahi (Variant of Shikishima class) Captain Nomoto Tsunaaki
 Nisshin (Flagship for Misu) (Giuseppe Garibaldi-class armoured cruiser) Captain Heitarō Takenouchi
 Kasuga (Giuseppe Garibaldi-class armoured cruiser) Captain Katō Sadakichi
 Tatsuta (Dispatch Vessel) Commander Yamagata Bunzō
 Third Division (Vice Admiral Dewa Shigetō)
 Kasagi (Flagship) (Kasagi-class protected cruiser) Captain Yamaya Tanin
 Chitose (Kasagi-class protected cruiser) Captain Takagi Sukekazu
 Niitaka (Niitaka-class protected cruiser) Captain Shōji Yoshimoto
 Otowa (variant of Niitaka-class protected cruiser) Captain Arima Ryōkitsu
 First Destroyer Division (Captain Fujimoto Shūshirō)
 Harusame (Harusame-class destroyer) Captain Fujimoto Shūshirō
 Fubuki (Harusame-class destroyer) Lieutenant Tōjima Otsukichirō
 Ariake (Harusame-class destroyer) Lieutenant Commander Kutsumi Tsuneo
 Arare (Harusame-class destroyer) Lieutenant Watanabe Shingo
 Akatsuki (Ex-Russian destroyer Reshitel'nyi) Lieutenant Harada Shōsaku
 Second Destroyer Division (Captain Yajima Junkichi)
 Oboro (Ikazuchi-class destroyer) Lieutenant Fujiwara Eizaburō
 Inazuma (Ikazuchi-class destroyer) Lieutenant Commander Suga Tetsuichirō
 Ikazuchi (Ikazuchi-class destroyer) Lieutenant Commander Saitō Hanroku
 Akebono (Ikazuchi-class destroyer) Lieutenant Yamanouchi Shirō
 Third Destroyer Division (Captain Yoshijima Jyūtarō)
 Shinonome (Shinonome-class destroyer) Lieutenant Commander Yoshida Mōshi
 Usugumo (Shinonome-class destroyer) Lieutenant Commander Masuda Chūkichirō
 Kasumi (Akatsuki-class destroyer) Lieutenant Commander Shiraishi Naosuke
 Sazanami (Ikazuchi-class destroyer) Lieutenant Commander Aiba Tsunezō
 14th Torpedo-Boat Division (Lieutenant Commander Seki Shigetaka)
 Chidori (Hayabusa-class torpedo boat) Lieutenant Commander Seki Shigetaka
 Hayabusa (Hayabusa-class torpedo boat) Lieutenant Ebihara Keiichi
 Manazuru (Hayabusa-class torpedo boat) Lieutenant Tamaoka Yoshirō
 Hashitaka (Hayabusa-class torpedo boat) Lieutenant Miyamoto Matsutarō

Second Squadron
(Vice Admiral Kamimura Hikonojō)
 Second Division (Rear Admiral Shimamura Hayao)
 Iwate (Flagship) (Izumo-class armoured cruiser) Captain Kawashima Reijirō
 Izumo (Izumo-class armoured cruiser) Captain Ijichi Suetaka
 Azuma (Armoured cruiser) Captain Murakami Kakuichi
 Tokiwa (Asama-class armoured cruiser) Captain Shigetarō Yoshimatsu
 Yakumo (Armoured cruiser) Captain Matsumoto Arinobu
 Asama (Asama-class armoured cruiser) Captain Yashiro Rokurō
 Chihaya (Dispatch Vessel) Commander Eguchi Rinroku
 Fourth Division (Vice Admiral Uryū Sotokichi)
 Naniwa (Flagship) (Naniwa-class protected cruiser) Captain Wada Kensuke
 Takachiho (Naniwa-class protected cruiser) Captain Mōri Ichihei
 Akashi (Suma-class protected cruiser) Captain Ushiki Kōshirō
 Tsushima (Niitaka-class protected cruiser) Captain Sentō Takenaka
 Fourth Destroyer Division (Captain Suzuki Kantarō)
 Asagiri (Harusame-class destroyer) Lieutenant Iida Nobutarō
 Murasame (Harusame-class destroyer) Lieutenant Commander Kobayashi Kenzō
 Shirakumo (Shirakumo-class destroyer) Lieutenant Commander Kamata Masamichi
 Asashio (Shirakumo-class destroyer) Lieutenant Commander Nanri Dan'ichi
 Fifth Destroyer Division (Commander Hirose Juntarō)
 Shiranui (Murakumo-class destroyer) Lieutenant Commander Kuwashima Shōzō
 Murakumo (Murakumo-class destroyer) Lieutenant Commander Shimanouchi Kanta
 Yūgiri (Murakumo-class destroyer) Lieutenant Commander Tashiro Miyoharu
 Kagerō (Murakumo-class destroyer) Lieutenant Yoshikawa Yasuhira
 9th Torpedo-Boat Division (Commander Kawase Hayaharu)
 Aotaka (Hayabusa-class torpedo boat) Commander Kawase Hayaharu
 Kari (Hayabusa-class torpedo boat) Lieutenant  Awaya Gazō
 Tsubame (Hayabusa-class torpedo boat) Lieutenant Tajiri Yuiji
 Hato (Hayabusa-class torpedo boat) Lieutenant Iguchi Daijirō
 19th Torpedo-Boat Division (Commander Matsuoka Shūzō)
 Kamome (Hayabusa-class torpedo boat) Commander Matsuoka Shūzō
 Ōtori (Hayabusa-class torpedo boat) Lieutenant Ōtani Kōshirō
 Kiji (Hayabusa-class torpedo boat) Lieutenant Kanzai Uemon

Third Squadron
(Vice Admiral Kataoka Shichirō)
 Fifth Division (Rear Admiral Taketomi Kunikane)
 Hashidate (Flagship) (Matsushima-class protected cruiser) Captain Fukui Masayoshi
 Itsukushima (Matsushima-class protected cruiser) Captain Tsuchiya Tamotsu
 Chin'en (Rebuilt ex-Chinese turret ship Zhenyuan) Captain Imai Kanemasa
 Matsushima (Matsushima-class protected cruiser) Captain Okumiya Mamoru
 Yaeyama (Dispatch Vessel) Commander Nishiyama Sanechika
 Sixth Division (Rear Admiral Tōgō Masamichi)
 Suma (Flagship) (Suma-class protected cruiser) Captain Tochiuchi Sōjirō
 Chiyoda (protected cruiser) Captain Higashifushimi Yorihito
 Akitsushima (2nd class protected cruiser) Captain Hirose Katsuhiko
 Izumi (2nd class protected cruiser, Ex-Chilean cruiser Esmeralda) Captain Ishida Ichirō
 Seventh Division (Rear Admiral Hikohachi Yamada)
 Fusō (Flagship) (Ironclad cruiser) Captain Nagai Gunkichi
 Takao (Unprotected cruiser) Captain Yashiro Yoshinori
 Tsukushi (Unprotected cruiser) Commander Tsuchiyama Tetsuzō
 Chōkai (Maya-class gunboat) Commander Ushida Jūzaburō
 Maya (Maya-class gunboat) Commander Fujita Sadaichi
 Uji (Gunboat) Lieutenant Commander Kaneko Mitsuyoshi
 15th Torpedo-Boat Division (Lieutenant Commander Kondō Tsunematsu)
 Hibari (Hayabusa-class torpedo boat) Lieutenant Commander Kondō Tsunematsu
 Sagi (Hayabusa-class torpedo boat) Lieutenant Yokoo Nao
 Hashitaka (Hayabusa-class torpedo boat) Lieutenant Mori Shunzō
 Uzura (Hayabusa-class torpedo boat) Lieutenant Suzuki Ujimasa
 10th Torpedo-Boat Division (Lieutenant Commander Ōtaki Michisuke)
 No. 43 Lieutenant Commander Ōtaki Michisuke
 No. 40 Sub-lieutenant Nakahara Yahei
 No. 41 Lieutenant Mizuno Hironori
 No. 39 Lieutenant Ōgane Minoru
 11th Torpedo-Boat Division (Lieutenant Commander Fujimoto Umejirō)
 No. 73 Lieutenant Commander Fujimoto Umejirō
 No. 72 Lieutenant Sasao Gennojō
 No. 74 Lieutenant Ōtawara Tōru
 No. 75 Lieutenant Kawai Taizō
 20th Torpedo-Boat Division (Lieutenant Commander Kubo Kimata)
 No. 65 Lieutenant Commander Kubo Kimata
 No. 62 Lieutenant Tona Genzaburō
 No. 64 Lieutenant Tominaga Torajirō
 No. 63 Lieutenant Eguchi Kinma
 1st Torpedo-Boat Division (Lieutenant Commander Fukuda Masateru)
 No. 69 Lieutenant Commander Fukuda Masateru Lost in battle
 No. 70 Lieutenant Nangō Jirō
 No. 67 Lieutenant Nakamuta Takemasa
 No. 68 Lieutenant Teraoka Hyōgo

Special Duty Squadron
(Rear Admiral Ogura Byōichirō)
 Special Duty Division
 Taichū Maru (Flagship) (Transport ship) Captain Matsumura Naoomi
 Amerika Maru (Armed merchantman) Captain Ishibashi Hajime
 Sado Maru (Armed merchantman) Captain Kamaya Tadamichi
 Shinano Maru (Armed merchantman) Captain Narikawa Hakaru
 Manshū Maru (Dispatch boat) Commander Nishiyama Yasukichi
 Yawata Maru (Armed merchantman) Captain Kawai Shōgo
 Tainan Maru (Armed merchantman) Captain Takahashi Sukeichirō
 Kumano Maru (Armed merchantman) Captain Asai Shōjirō
 Nikkō Maru (Armed merchantman) Captain Kimura Kōkichi
 Taichung Maru (Armed merchantman) Captain Matsumura Naoomi
 Kasuga Maru (Armed merchantman) Captain Obana Sangō
 Taijin Maru (Armed merchantman) Captain Arakawa Noriyuki
 Heijō Maru (Armed merchantman) Captain Chayama Toyoya
 Keijō Maru (Armed merchantman) Captain Hanafusa Yūshirō
 Ehime Maru (Armed merchantman) Commander Yonemura Sueki
 Kōryū Maru (Armed merchantman) Commander Karashima Masao
 Kōsaka Maru (Armed merchantman) Commander Kawamura Tatsuzō
 Mukogawa Maru (Armed merchantman) Commander Tachikawa Tsuneji
 5th Uwajima Maru (Armed merchantman) Commander Yonehara Sueo
 Kaijō Maru (Armed merchantman) Commander Ishimaru Tōta
 Fusō Maru (Armed merchantman) Commander Nakamura Kumazō
 Kantō Maru (Armed merchantman) Commander Sata Naomichi
 Miike Maru (Armed merchantman) Commander Kunieda Katsusaburō

Divisions outside of the Combined Fleet

Kure Naval District
 5th Torpedo-Boat Division (Lieutenant Commander Ogawa Mizumichi)
 Fukuryū (Torpedo boat) Lieutenant Commander Ogawa Mizumichi
 No. 25 Lieutenant Moritsugu Kumashirō
 No. 26 Lieutenant Tanaka Yoshitarō
 No. 27 Lieutenant Nakayama Tomojirō
Takeshiki Guard District
 16th Torpedo-Boat Division (Lieutenant Commander Wakabayashi Kin)
 Shirataka (Torpedo boat) Lieutenant Commander Wakabayashi Kin
 No. 66 Lieutenant Kakuta Kanzō
 17th Torpedo-Boat Division (Lieutenant Commander Aoyama Yoshie)
 No. 34 Lieutenant Commander Aoyama Yoshie Lost in battle
 No. 31 Lieutenant Yamaguchi Sōtarō
 No. 32 Lieutenant Hitomi Saburō
 No. 33 Lieutenant Kawakita Kazuo
 18th Torpedo-Boat Division (Lieutenant Commander Kawada Katsuji)
 No. 36 Lieutenant Commander Kawada Katsuji
 No. 60 Lieutenant Kishina Masao
 No. 61 Lieutenant Miyamura Rekizō
 No. 35 Lieutenant Soejima Murahachi Lost in battle

Russian Fleet (Second and Third Pacific Squadrons)

Battle Fleet

 First Division (Vice-Admiral Zinovy Rozhestvensky)
 Knyaz Suvorov (Fleet Flagship) (Borodino-class battleship)  Captain Vasily Ignatius
 Imperator Aleksandr III (Borodino-class battleship) Captain Nikolai Bukhvostov
 Borodino (Borodino-class battleship)  Captain Pyotr Serebrennikov
 Oryol (Borodino-class battleship)  Captain Nikolay Yung
 Second Division (Captain Vladimir Baer)
 Oslyabya  (Flagship) (Peresvet-class battleship) Captain Vladimir Baer
 Sissoi Veliky (Battleship) Captain Manuil Ozerov
 Navarin (Variant of Trafalgar-class battleship) Captain Baron Bruno von Vietinghoff
 Admiral Nakhimov (Variant of Imperieuse-class armoured cruiser) Captain Rodionov
 Third Division (Rear-Admiral Nikolai Nebogatov)
 Imperator Nikolai I (Flagship) (Imperator Aleksandr II-class battleship) Captain Vladimir Smirnov
 General Admiral Graf Apraksin (Admiral Ushakov-class coastal defence ship) Captain Nikolai Lishin
 Admiral Seniavin (Admiral Ushakov-class coastal defense ship) Captain 
 Admiral Ushakov  (Admiral Ushakov-class coastal defense ship) Captain Vladimir Miklukha
 Attached Cruisers
 Zhemchug (Izumrud-class protected cruiser)
 Izumrud (Izumrud-class protected cruiser) Captain V.N. Fersen
 First Cruiser Division (Rear-Admiral Oskar Enkvist)
 Oleg (Flagship) (Bogatyr-class protected cruiser)
 Aurora (Pallada-class protected cruiser) Captain Evgeny Egoriev, Captain Arkady Nebolsin
 Dmitrii Donskoi (Armoured cruiser)  Captain Ivan Lebedev
 Vladimir Monomakh (Armoured cruiser) Captain Vladimir Popov
 Second Scouting Division
 Svetlana (Protected cruiser)
 Ural (Armed merchant cruiser)

Destroyer Flotilla
 First Destroyer Division
 Byedovy Captain 2nd rank Nikolai Vasilyevich Baranov
 Buiny Captain 2nd rank Nikolai Nikolaevich Kolomeytsev
 Bravy
 Buistry
 Second Destroyer Division
 Blestyashchy
 Bezuprechny
 Bodry
 Gromky
 Grozny Captain 2nd rank Andrzhievsky

Transport Squadron
 Auxiliaries
 Almaz (Armed Yacht classified as 2nd class cruiser)
 Anadyr (Transport/Merchant Ship)
 Irtuish (Transport/Merchant Ship)
 Kamchatka (Repair Ship)
 Koreya (Ammunition Ship)
 Rus (Fleet Tug)
 Svir (Fleet Tug)
 Oryol (Hospital Ship)
 Kostroma (Hospital Ship)

Notes

References
 Forczyk, Robert. Russian Battleship vs Japanese Battleship, Yellow Sea 1904–1905. 2009. Osprey. .

Battles involving Japan
Battles involving Russia
Naval battles of the Russo-Japanese War
Orders of battle